Nathan Perkovich (born October 15, 1985) is an professional Croatian American ice hockey player. He is currently an unrestricted free agent who most recently played for the Florida Everblades in the ECHL. He was selected by the New Jersey Devils in the 8th round (250th overall) of the 2004 NHL Entry Draft. In 2015, Perkovich played for the Croatian national team at the IIHF World Championship Division I.

Playing career
Before turning professional Perkovich played three years at NCAA Division 1 Lake Superior State University, in Sault Sainte Marie, MI.

Approaching his seventh season with Croatian club, KHL Medveščak Zagreb, he began the second season of their return from the Kontinental Hockey League to the EBEL, before returning to North America after securing a one-year contract for the 2018–19 season with the Florida Everblades of the ECHL on October 18, 2018. 

On August 5, 2019, the Greenville Swamp Rabbits of the ECHL announced that Perkovich had signed a standard player contract for the 2019–20 season. As a veteran for the Swamp Rabbits, Perkovich improved upon his previous season totals, recording 27 assists and 46 points in 58 regular season games before the remainder of the season was cancelled due to the COVID-19 pandemic.

Having left the Swamp Rabbits at the conclusion of his contract, Perkovich continued in the ECHL by agreeing to terms with the Jacksonville Icemen on August 25, 2020. He made a solitary appearance with the Icemen before securing a contract abroad with Hungarian club, Újpesti TE of the Erste Liga, on January 19, 2021.

He returned to the Florida Everblades for the 2021–22 season, where he won the Kelly Cup.

Career statistics

Regular season and playoffs

International

References

External links

1985 births
Living people
Albany Devils players
American people of Croatian descent
Cedar Rapids RoughRiders players
Chicago Steel players
Croatian ice hockey forwards
Florida Everblades players
Greenville Swamp Rabbits players
Jacksonville Icemen players
KHL Medveščak Zagreb players
New Jersey Devils draft picks
Lake Superior State Lakers men's ice hockey players
Lowell Devils players
Ice hockey players from Michigan